Stephanie Janette Block (born September 19, 1972) is an American actress and singer, best known for her work on the Broadway stage.

Block made her Broadway debut in 2003, originating the role of Liza Minnelli in The Boy from Oz. After reading for the role of Elphaba during the early stages of Wicked in 2000, Block became the first actress to play the role in the show's first U.S. national tour in 2005. She later reprised the role of Elphaba on Broadway from 2007 to 2008.

A three-time Tony Award nominee and six-time Drama Desk Award nominee, Block won the 2019 Tony Award for Best Actress in a Musical and Drama Desk Award for Outstanding Actress in a Musical for her lead performance in The Cher Show. She also received Tony and Drama Desk nominations for her performances in The Mystery of Edwin Drood (2013) and Falsettos (2016). She received Drama Desk nominations for her performances in the Off-Broadway productions of By the Way, Meet Vera Stark (2011) and Little Miss Sunshine (2013), as well as in the Broadway production of 9 to 5 (2009).

Additionally, Block has appeared on numerous cast recordings and released a solo album, This Place I Know, in 2009. Her television credits include recurring roles on Madam Secretary (2017) and Rise (2018).

Block starred as The Baker's Wife in a Broadway revival of Stephen Sondheim's Into the Woods and will reprise the role in the U.S. national tour.

Early life and education
Block was born on September 19, 1972, in Brea, California, and has one sister, Renée. Her mother, Rosemarie ( Garritano), worked for the local school district, and her father, Steven Block, was a welfare fraud investigator. She was raised Catholic. 

Of German and Italian descent, Stephanie grew up in Brea, where she attended St. Angela Merici Parish School (then 1-8, now pre-K through 8). Later she attended an all-girls Catholic private school, Rosary High School (in Fullerton, California), for her secondary education. She finished up her high-school years at the Orange County High School of the Arts.

Acting career
Block started her professional musical theater career with regional theater, appearing in many productions including Funny Girl, Crazy for You, Oliver!, James Joyce's The Dead, and Bells Are Ringing. Block was additionally the original Belle in the Disneyland production of Beauty and the Beast and did voice work for numerous commercials, including the singing voice of Barbie.

In early 2000, Block read the part of Elphaba in the first reading of the new musical Wicked. After a few months of reading, she was replaced by Idina Menzel, a decision that left Block devastated, but accepting of the decision that had been made to cast a more experienced performer in the role. She was Menzel's understudy in the San Francisco tryout in 2003, but she left the show prior to Broadway when she was offered a lead role in a new Broadway musical, The Boy from Oz. 

Block made her Broadway debut in 2003, playing the role of Liza Minnelli opposite Hugh Jackman's Peter Allen in the show. The show received mixed reviews but proved to be a hit with audiences, playing on Broadway for close to a year. The musical received several Tony Award nominations, including a nomination for Best Musical.

In spring 2005, Block originated the role of Elphaba in the first national tour of Wicked. She was awarded both the 2006 Helen Hayes Award and the 2007 Carbonell Award for Best Actress in a Non-Resident Production for this role. Block received great reviews for a show-stopping performance. After performing with the tour for a year, Block left the production in March 2006 and was replaced by Julia Murney.

In 2007 Block performed in the title role of the new Broadway musical The Pirate Queen, with music written by Claude-Michel Schönberg and Alain Boublil. Block was praised by critics, such as Ben Brantley from The New York Times, for giving a "truly felt, realistic, performance". She also received a nomination for a Drama League Award for her performance. Plagued by insufficient ticket sales and harsh reviews, the show opened in April and barely played for two months at the Hilton Theatre, closing in June. Later that year Block reprised the role of Elphaba in Wicked on Broadway beginning October 9, 2007, where she replaced Julia Murney. She left the production after eight months, on June 15, 2008, and was succeeded by Kerry Ellis.

Block starred alongside Allison Janney, Megan Hilty, and Marc Kudisch in the musical adaptation of the 1980 film 9 to 5. The production was directed by Joe Mantello with music written by Dolly Parton. The show opened on Broadway in April 2009 at the Marquis Theatre and closed in September 2009. Block starred as Judy Bernly, the frazzled divorcée, the role played by Jane Fonda in the film. For this role Block was nominated for the Drama Desk Award for Outstanding Actress in a Musical.

In 2009, Block released her debut album through PS Classics titled This Place I Know. Although the album failed to chart, it was a hit with critics with some hailing it as the best album that has come out of the Broadway community in some time. 

More recently, she has done concert work in London's West End. In February 2010 she performed live at the New Players Theatre in London.<ref>{{Cite web|last=Hetrick|first=Adam|date=December 24, 2009|title=9 to 5s Block to Offer London Concerts in 2010|url=http://www.playbill.com/news/article/135504-9-to-5s-Block-to-Offer-London-Concerts-in-2010|url-status=dead|archive-url=https://web.archive.org/web/20091227065455/http://www.playbill.com/news/article/135504-9-to-5s-Block-to-Offer-London-Concerts-in-2010|archive-date=December 27, 2009|website=Playbill}}</ref>

Block was seen as Grizabella in the Municipal Opera Production production of Cats, which ran from July 19–25, 2010. Block also starred as Sonia Walsk alongside Jason Alexander in the Reprise Theatre Company's production of They're Playing Our Song, which played at the UCLA Freud Playhouse for two weeks from September 28 – October 10, 2010.

Block made her off-Broadway debut as Gloria Mitchell in the play By the Way, Meet Vera Stark by Pulitzer Prize winner Lynn Nottage alongside Karen Olivo and David Garrison. By the Way, Meet Vera Stark played at Second Stage Theatre through June 12, 2011. Entertainment Weekly wrote that Block's performance in the show was, "terrifically over-the-top". She received a nomination for the Drama Desk Award for Outstanding Featured Actress in a Play.

Block starred as Reno Sweeney in the Broadway revival of Anything Goes, first playing the role for three weeks in November 2011 while Sutton Foster was away filming a pilot episode. Block performed with co-star Colin Donnell on the 2011 CBS Thanksgiving Day Parade. Block returned to the role on March 15, 2012, as Foster left the production permanently on March 11. She remained with the show until its closure on July 8, 2012.

Block performed the lead role in Roundabout Theatre Company's production of The Mystery of Edwin Drood, which ran from November 13, 2012, to March 10, 2013. For this role, she was nominated for another Drama Desk Award for Outstanding Actress in a Musical and received a nomination for the Tony Award for Best Actress in a Musical.

From November 14 to December 15, 2013, Block appeared in the Off-Broadway production of Little Miss Sunshine at Second Stage Theatre as Sheryl Hoover. For this role, she received a nomination for the Drama Desk Award for Outstanding Featured Actress in a Musical.

Block played Trina in the 2016 Broadway revival of Falsettos, directed by James Lapine. She was joined by Christian Borle and Andrew Rannells who played Marvin and Whizzer, respectively. The musical began previews on September 29, 2016, and opened officially on October 27, 2016. The limited run ended on January 8, 2017. For her performance, Block received rave reviews, with The New York Times writing that she is "better here than ever". She received nominations for the Tony Award for Best Featured Actress in a Musical, the Drama Desk Award for Outstanding Featured Actress in a Musical, and the Outer Critics Circle Award for Outstanding Featured Actress in a Musical.

Block had a recurring role in the NBC series Rise, playing Patricia, a devout Catholic who ends up at odds with her husband over their son's involvement in a controversial high school play.

Block played singer Cher in the biomusical The Cher Show. The musical played an out-of-town tryout in Chicago at the Oriental Theatre, beginning on June 12, 2018, and running through July 15. The production opened on Broadway at the Neil Simon Theatre in December 2018. For this performance, Block won the 2019 Drama Desk Award for Outstanding Actress in a Musical and the Tony Award for Best Actress in a Musical. She also won an Outer Critics Circle Award and was nominated for a Drama League Award. The Cher Show ended its run on August 18, 2019.

On August 1, 2021, Stephanie launched STAGES PODCAST, with Marylee G. Fairbanks. 

In August 2022, it was announced that Block would replace Sara Bareilles as the Baker's Wife in the Broadway revival of Into the Woods beginning September 6 of that year and would star alongside her husband Sebastian Arcelus, who played the Baker. She then starred alongside Brian d'Arcy James, who returned to the show after Arcelus's limited engagement ended the following month. Block and Arcelus are slated to reprise their roles in the production's U.S. national tour, which is scheduled to launch in early 2023. Prior to that, Arcelus once again starred alongside Block in the Broadway production for its final week of performances in January 2023. Block is also slated to star as Norma Desmond in the Kennedy Center production of Sunset Boulevard from February 1–8, 2023.

Personal life
Block married actor Sebastian Arcelus on October 25, 2007. Arcelus starred alongside Block in the first national tour of Wicked as the Fiyero replacement from January to March 2006 and again on Broadway from October to December 2007. They have one daughter, Vivienne Helena Arcelus, who was born January 19, 2015.

Acting credits
Theatre
{| class="wikitable sortable" style="width:100%" 
|-
! Year
! Title
! Role
! Theatre
! Director(s)
! 
|-
| 1994
| The Will Rogers Follies
| Ziegfeld's Favorite
| Will Rogers Theatre
| 
| 
|-
| 1995
| Godspell
|Robin/Dance Captain
| U.S. National Tour
| 
| 
|-
|rowspan=3 |1997
| Crazy for You
| Polly
| La Mirada Theatre for the Performing Arts
| 
| 
|-
| Damn Yankees
| Gloria Thorpe
| Sacramento Music Circus
| 
| 
|-
| South Pacific
| Nellie Forbush
| Cabrillo Music Theatre
| 
| 
|-
| 1998
| Guys and Dolls
| Sarah Brown
| Civic Light Opera of South Bay Cities
| 
| 
|-
| rowspan=2 |1999
| Bye Bye Birdie
| Rosie
| Sacramento Music Circus
| 
| 
|-
| Bells Are Ringing
| Gwynne
| Reprise Theatre Company
| 
| 
|-
| rowspan=3 | 2000
|Call Me Madam
|
| UCLA Freud Playhouse
| 
| 
|-
| James Joyce's The Dead
| Mary Jane Morkan
| Kennedy Center's Eisenhower Theatre 
| 
| 
|-
| Funny Girl
| Fanny Brice
|Thousand Oaks Civic Arts Plaza
| 
| 
|-
| rowspan=4 |2001
|Triumph of Love
| Corine
| Santa Barbara Civic Light Opera
| 
| 
|-
| Oliver!
| Nancy
| Paramount Theatre
| 
| 
|-
| Crazy for You
| Polly
| Redondo Beach Performing Arts Center 
| 
| 
|-
| Haven
| Ruth Gruber 
| Gindi Auditorium
| 
| 
|-
| rowspan=3 |2002
| The Grass Harp
| Baby Love Dallas
| Pasadena Playhouse
| 
| 
|-
| Fiddler on the Roof
| Tzeitel
| Pittsburgh Civic Light Opera
| 
| 
|-
| I Love a Piano
| Ginger
| Temple Hoyne Buell Theatre
| 
| 
|-
| rowspan=2 |2003
| Let Me Sing
| Molly
| Charlotte Repertory Theatre 
| 
| 
|-
| Wicked
| Ensemble 
| Curran Theatre
| 
| 
|-
| 2003–04
|  The Boy from Oz | Liza Minnelli| Imperial Theatre| 
| 
|-
| 2005–06
| Wicked
| Elphaba
| U.S. National Tour
| 
| 
|-
| 2006
| rowspan= 2|  The Pirate Queen | rowspan= 2| Grace O'Malley| Cadillac Palace Theatre
| rowspan=2 | 
| 
|-
| 2007
| Hilton Theatre| 
|-
|2007–08
| Wicked | Elphaba 
| Gershwin Theatre| rowspan=3| 
| 
|-
|2008
| rowspan= 2|  9 to 5 | rowspan= 2| Judy Bernly| Ahmanson Theatre
| 
|-
| 2009
| Marquis Theatre| 
|-
| rowspan=2 |2010
| Cats
| Grizabella
| The Muny
| 
| 
|-
| They're Playing Our Song
| Sonia Walsk
| Freud Playhouse
| 
| 
|-
| 2011
| By the Way, Meet Vera Stark
| Gloria Mitchell
| Second Stage Theatre
| 
| 
|-
| 2011–12
|  Anything Goes | Reno Sweeney 
| Stephen Sondheim Theatre| 
| 
|-
| 2012–13
|  The Mystery of Edwin Drood | Edwin Drood / Alice Nutting| Studio 54| 
| 
|-
| 2013
| Little Miss Sunshine
| Sheryl Hoover
| Second Stage Theatre
| rowspan=2 | 
| 
|-
| 2016–17
| Falsettos | Trina| Walter Kerr Theatre| 
|-
| 2017
| Brigadoon
| Meg Brockie
|  New York City Center
| 
| 
|-
| 2018
| rowspan= 2|  The Cher Show | rowspan= 2|  Star| Oriental Theatre
| rowspan= 2| 
| 
|-
| 2018–19
| Neil Simon Theatre| 
|-
|2022–23
| Into the Woods | The Baker's Wife 
|  St. James Theatre '''
|
| 
|-
|rowspan=2|2023
|Sunset Boulevard| Norma Desmond
| Kennedy Center
| 
| 
|-
|Into the Woods|The Baker’s Wife
|U.S. National Tour
| 
| 
|}
• 

Film

Television

Concerts

 Stephanie J. Block at Cafe Carlyle  at The Carlyle (February 11–15, 2020) 
 Broadway Stands Up for Freedom: We The People at Town Hall (2018)
 The Pros and Con-cert at The Cabaret in Indianapolis (2018)
 Stephanie J. Block Live at Lincoln Center filmed for PBS (2018)
 It's Christmastime In The City with Brian D'Arcy James and the New York Pops (2015)
 On Broadway with Andrew Rannells and the New York Pops (2014)
 Tapestry of Song and Voices of Youth (The Indianapolis Children's Choir) with Henry Leck, Josh Pedde and Cheryl West (2014)
 Do You Hear the People Sing? with Peter Lockyer, Terrence Mann, Lea Salonga, Marie Zamora, the Indianapolis Symphony Orchestra and Symphonic Choir (2011)
 Broadway on the Beach with Doug LaBrecque and the Reno Philharmonic Orchestra (2011)
 Pops on the River: Summer Lovin' with Doug LaBrecque and the Reno Philharmonic Orchestra (2011)
 Broadway & the American Songbook (Wicked Divas) with Julia Murney and the Boston Pops (2011)
 Broadway Voices solo concert in Garner, NC (2011)
 Wicked Divas with Julia Murney and the Utah Symphony Orchestra (2011)
 Wicked Divas with Julia Murney and the Odgen Symphony Ballet (2011)
 Marvin Hamlisch: Broadway's Greatest Moments at The Krannert Center (2011)
 Solo concert presented by the Austin Cabaret Theatre (2011)
 Wicked Divas with Erin Mackey and the Cleveland Pops (2010)

 The Best of Broadway with the Ridgefield Symphony Orchestra (2010)
 Wicked Divas with Julia Murney and the Columbus Symphony Orchestra (2010)
 Don't Stop Believing at the Cobb Energy Performing Arts Centre in Atlanta, GA (2010)
 Broadway Comes to Tampa (2010)
 Stephanie J. Block in Concert at The New Players Theatre (2010)
 xoxoXMAS at Birdland (2009)
 Scott Alan: Just Me...And Them at the Leicester Square Theatre (2009)
 True Colors Cabaret (2009)
 Nothing Like a Dame at New World Stages (2009)
 Visa Signature Tony Awards Preview Concert at the Hudson Theatre (2009)
 Defying Inequality at the Gershwin Theatre (2009)
 The Yellow Brick Road Not Taken at the Gershwin Theatre (2008)
 Mr. Green's Opus at Birdland (2008)
 Block Party at Birdland (2007)
 Billy Stritch and the Girls at Birdland (2007)
 The Broadway Musicals of 1925 (2007)
 An Evening with Andrew Lippa (2006)
 Block Party at Birdland (2006)
 Broadway Comes to Tampa (2006)
 Valentine at Birdland (2005)
 All Smiles at Birdland (2004)

Discography
Cast recordings
 The Boy from Oz – Original Broadway Cast (2003)
 The Pirate Queen – Original Broadway Cast Recording (2007)
 9 to 5 –The Musical – Original Broadway Cast Recording (2009)
 The Mystery of Edwin Drood – The 2013 New Broadway Cast Recording (2013)
 Falsettos – 2016 New Broadway Cast Recording (2016)
 Lerner & Loewe's Brigadoon – New York City Center 2017 Cast Recording (2018)
 The Cher Show – Original Broadway Cast Recording (2019)

Collaborative projects
 The Broadway Musicals of 1925 (2003)
 Broadway's Carols for a Cure, Volume 5 (2003)
 Broadway's Carols for a Cure, Volume 6 (2004)
 Broadway Unplugged 2004 (2004)
 A Joyful Christmas (2004)
 Thankful (2004)
 The Broadway Musicals Cut-Outs (2007)
 Dreaming Wide Awake: The Music of Scott Alan (2007)
 Wicked: 5th Anniversary Cast Recording (2008)
 Chasing the Day: The Music of Will Van Dyke (2010)
 Sorta Love Songs: The Songs of Scott Burkell and Paul Loesel (2010)
 Wicked: Deluxe Edition (2013)
 Ahrens & Flaherty: Nice Fighting You (2014)

Solo albums
 This Place I Know'' (2009)

Accolades

References

External links
 
 Interview with Stephanie on MusicalTalk Podcast
 
 
 
 Star File: Stephanie J. Block
 BroadwayWorld.com interview with Stephanie J. Block, August 21, 2007
  (archive)

Living people
American musical theatre actresses
Actresses from Orange County, California
1972 births
21st-century American actresses
21st-century American women singers
American mezzo-sopranos
Singers from California
People from Brea, California
Orange County School of the Arts alumni
Tony Award winners
The Young Americans members